is a Japanese track and field sprint athlete who specializes in the 100 metres. She is the joint Japanese record holder in the 4×100 m relay, having run a time of 43.39 seconds alongside Momoko Takahashi, Chisato Fukushima and Kana Ichikawa at the 2011 Seiko Golden Grand Prix.

He first international competitions came in 2004, when she took the bronze medal over 60 metres at the 2004 Asian Indoor Athletics Championships and reached the 100 m semi-finals at that year's World Junior Championships in Athletics. The following year she came fourth at the 2005 East Asian Games before helping the Japanese women to the 4×100 m relay title.

An appearance on the continental stage followed at the 2006 Asian Games (where she was seventh in the 100 m final) and a relay silver medal came at the 2007 Asian Athletics Championships. Kitakaze earned her first global level selection for Japan that year, but her relay team was disqualified in the preliminary rounds of the 2007 World Championships in Athletics.

Personal bests

Records
4×100 m relay
Current Japanese record holder - 43.39 s (relay leg:1st) (Kawasaki, 8 May 2011)

 with Momoko Takahashi, Chisato Fukushima, and Kana Ichikawa

Competition record

National Championship

References

External links
 
 Saori Kitakaze at JAAF 

1985 births
Living people
Japanese female sprinters
People from Kushiro, Hokkaido
Athletes (track and field) at the 2006 Asian Games
Asian Games competitors for Japan